Shah-e Bozorg (also Romanized as Shāh-e Bozorg) is a village in Keshvar Rural District, Papi District, Khorramabad County, Lorestan Province, Iran. At the 2006 census, its population was 39, in 10 families.

References 

Towns and villages in Khorramabad County